Captain Shivrampant Damle (April 14, 1900 in Maval – July 25, 1977 in Pune) was an Indian educationist. He is best remembered for founding the Maharashtriya Mandal in 1924.

Biography 
Damle was born on April 14, 1900 to Vishnu (d. 1928) and Lakshmi (née Chimnatai Modak; d. 1934) of the Damle gharana of Kivale. He was one of eight children born to his parents; he had six brothers and one sister. His family was Chitpavan brahmin. 

Damle was educated at the Nutan Marathi Vidyalaya in Pune. He graduated with a B. A. degree from Sir Parshurambhau College before going on to found the Maharashtra Mandal in 1924, serving as its first secretary. Beginning in 1930, he served as the governor of the Maharashtra Mandal.

From 1942 to 1948, he joined the British Indian Army. During World War II, he was posted in Belgaum. From 1951 to 1975 he again took up governorship of the Mandal.

Beginning in 1963, he founded the Seth Dagduram Kataria High School, founding the Indirabai Karandikar Primary School on Tilak road in Pune in 1964, and founding schools for primary education in Marathi in 1968 and 1970, focusing on women's education.

On July 1, 1977, he founded the Chandrashekhar Agashe College of Physical Education in Gultekdi, Pune, having begun work for its founding in 1938.

Damle married Kamlabai Bapat, who predeceased him in 1968. The couple had two children, a son named Ramesh (b. 1935) and a daughter named Sunanda (b. 1937). Damle died on July 25, 1977, with his son succeeding him as governor of the Mandal.

References

Sources 

1900 births
1977 deaths
Marathi people
Indian educators
Educators from Maharashtra
20th-century Indian educators
Indian academic administrators
Heads of universities and colleges in India
Indian institute directors
Social workers from Maharashtra
British Indian Army personnel
British Indian Army officers